The Twilight Hours is a band formed by Matt Wilson and John Munson. Munson and Wilson also played together in Trip Shakespeare and The Flops, and Munson is also known for his work with Semisonic, The New Standards, and John Munson and the Witnesses.

Background
Founding members Wilson and Munson first performed together in the band E. Brown and then in Trip Shakespeare. Trip Shakespeare was picked up by A&M records but did not achieve commercial success. Munson joined with Wilson's brother Dan, who had also been a member of Trip Shakespeare, to form the band Semisonic, along with Jacob Slichter. Semisonic was signed by MCA and received enough airplay to have some of their songs reach the Pop and Modern charts. During this time Matt Wilson began a solo career and released the "Burnt, White, and Blue" album. When Semisonic went on hiatus, Munson reunited with Wilson and formed The Flops which was dissolved in 2005 as the pair decided to move their music in a new direction and the band The Twilight Hours began to take shape.

Formation
The Twilight Hours was first envisioned as strictly a duo between Matt Wilson and John Munson, where they would limit themselves to upright bass and acoustic guitar. As they progressed they soon abandoned the idea and added drums, electric guitar and electric bass rather than upright bass. In an interview with public television Wilson described forming the band and stated "It's right back to the same phantom sound we have been chasing for years and years." Munson described the growth of The Twilight Hours saying "Now the band has kind of evolved a sound, so you bring in this new song and the band makes it alive, it very quickly becomes a living work of art."

Discography
Stereo Night (2009)
Black Beauty (2016)

Members
2008–2015
Matt Wilson – vocals, guitar
John Munson – bass guitar, vocals ukulele
Steve Roehm – drums
Jacques Wait – guitar
Dave Salmela – keyboards, vocals

2016–present
Matt Wilson – vocals, occasional guitar
John Munson – bass guitar, vocals, ukulele
Steve Roehm – guitar
Jacques Wait – guitar
Dave Salmela – keyboards, vocals
Richard Medek – drums

Announced Shows

Past Shows

Show setlists are compiled from postings on The Twilight Hours fan forum:

References

External links
 The Twilight Hours Web Site
 Matt Wilson re-emerges in The Twilight Hours
 The Twilight Hours' Stereo Night: A shimmering debut
 City Pages' Best of Awards: The Twilight Hours
 Matt Wilson, John Munson shine on new project the Twilight Hours

American folk rock groups
Musical groups from Minnesota
2008 establishments in Minnesota
Musical groups established in 2008